Leo Martinez (born March 7, 1950) is a Filipino actor, comedian and director. Martinez also served as Director General of the Film Academy of the Philippines.

Personal life
He is married to Gina Valenciano (sister of Gary Valenciano), and has child named Lesley Elvira Valenciano Martinez. He also has another child, Jeremiah David (Jay), from a previous relationship with actress Cherie Gil.

Filmography

Film

Television

Awards and nominations

References

External links

1950 births
Living people
ABS-CBN personalities
Filipino male comedians
Filipino male film actors
Filipino people of American descent
Filipino people of Spanish descent
GMA Network personalities
People from Batangas
People from Metro Manila